Adolfas Akelaitis (16 January 1910 – 21 December 2007) was a Lithuanian athlete. He competed in the men's high jump at the 1928 Summer Olympics.

References

External links
 

1910 births
2007 deaths
Athletes (track and field) at the 1928 Summer Olympics
Lithuanian male high jumpers
Olympic athletes of Lithuania